Levon Harutyunyan (born January 19, 1967), is an Armenian actor, presenter and playwright. He is known for his roles as Hakop on Lost & Found in Armenia, Zorik Karolovich on With the Whole Family, and Smbat on Thank you, Dad. In 1990, at the invitation of Nikolay Tsaturyan, he started working as an actor in "Metro" theater where he played in many performances.

Harutyunyan has been a member of several popular Armenian TV projects.

Filmography

Awards 
 Stanislavski Award (1992)
 Best Male Actor (for  "Uilli, Titti, Djig and the three of them are A girl") (1993)

Performances
 "Aralez"
 "Topaz"
 "My sin" (Իմ մեղքը)
 "Djin-Djan" (Ջին-ջան)
 "Uilli, Titti, Djig and the three of them are A girl" (Ուիլլի, Թիթի, Ջիգ, և երեքն էլ մի աղջիկ).

References

External links 

«Ես ուզում էի սիրել, երևի այդ պատճառով էլ նա եկավ». Լևոն Հարությունյան
Interview
Page on kino-teatr.ru (Russian)

1967 births
Living people
Armenian male film actors
21st-century Armenian male actors
20th-century Armenian male actors
Armenian television presenters